Hrafske may refer to the following places in Ukraine:

Hrafske, Donetsk Oblast, urban-type settlement in Volnovakha Raion
Hrafske, Kharkiv Oblast, village in Chuhuiv Raion
Hrafske, Sumy Oblast, village in Sumy Raion